Ingersoll is a surname derived of the Old Norse words "Ingvar" or "Inger" and "sál", common words in found in modern Icelandic, Swedish and Norwegian. 

Surnames derived from Old Norse have changed over time due to the splitting of the language into modern Icelandic, Norwegian, Swedish, Greenlandic, Faroese and Danish as well as names being changed with immigration into new countries like the United States.

This surname has split over time into some of these common spellings: Ingersoll, Ingersöll, Ingersol, Ingersole, Ingvarsson, Ingersson, Inkersoll, and Ingwersol.

During the Viking Age, from the late 8th century to the mid-11th century, the Old Norse language expanded through Europe as the Vikings conquered and settled areas like Normandy (Normanni in Old Norse) and Inkersall (Ingvarsál in Old Norse).

 Andrew Ingersoll (born 1940), American astronomer and professor of planetary science at the California Institute of Technology
 Bob Ingersoll (born 1952), American lawyer and writer
 C. Jared Ingersoll (1894-1988), American president of the Muskogee Company and brother of John H. W. Ingersoll 
 Charles Ingersoll (disambiguation), multiple people
 Colin M. Ingersoll (1819-1903), United States. Representative from Connecticut, son of Ralph Isaacs Ingersoll
 Ebon C. Ingersoll (1831-1879), United States Representative from Illinois
 Ernest Ingersoll (1852-1946), American naturalist, writer and explorer
 Ezekiel J. Ingersoll (1838–1925), American politician
 Frederick Ingersoll (1876-1927) American inventor, engineer, and entrepreneur who created the world's first amusement park chain
 Jared Ingersoll (1749–1822), United States Constitution signer
 John H. W. Ingersoll, American president of the Muskogee Company  and brother of C. Jared Ingersoll
 Jonathan Ingersoll (died 1823),  Lieutenant Governor of Connecticut from 1816 to 1823 
 Jonathan E. Ingersoll, (born circa 1949) American economist
 Joseph Reed Ingersoll (1786–1868), American lawyer and statesman from Philadelphia, Pennsylvania
 Ralph Isaacs Ingersoll (1789–1872), United States Representative from Connecticut
 Ralph McAllister Ingersoll (1900–1985), American publisher
 Robert G. Ingersoll (1833–1899), American orator and political leader
 Robert Stephen Ingersoll (1914-2010), American businessman and diplomat
 Robert Sturgis Ingersoll (1891-1973), American president of the Philadelphia Museum of Art from 1948 to 1964
 Robert Hawley Ingersoll, co-founder of the Ingersoll Watch Company
 Royal R. Ingersoll (1847–1931), Rear Admiral, U.S. Navy
 Royal E. Ingersoll (1883–1976), Admiral, U.S. Navy
 Royal R. Ingersoll, II (1913–1942), Lieutenant, U.S. Navy
 Simon Ingersoll (1818–1894), American founder of Ingersoll Rand
 Stuart H. Ingersoll (1898-1983), Admiral, U.S. Navy
 Thomas Ingersoll (1749–1812), Canadian early settler
 Truman Ward Ingersoll (1862 – 1922), US photographer 
 William Ingersoll (actor) (1860 – 1936), American actor
 William P. Ingersoll (philanthropist) (1885–1973), American philanthropist, owner of the William Ingersoll Estate

See also
Ingersoll (disambiguation)
Ingvar
Inger (given name)
Ingvarsson
Ingerson
sál

References

English-language surnames